Since the 20th century, Buddhism and Judaism have become associated with one another due to the common religious overlap in Jewish Buddhists. According to the Ten Commandments and classical Jewish law (halacha), it is forbidden for any Jew to worship any deity other than the God of Israel – specifically by bowing, offering incense, sacrifices and/or poured libations. It is likewise forbidden to join or serve in another religion because doing so would render such an individual an apostate or an idol worshipper.

Since most Buddhists do not consider the Buddha to have been a god, Jewish Buddhists do not consider Buddhist practice to be worship. This is despite some practices including incense and food offerings made to a statue of the Buddha, and both prostration and bowing done before a statue of the Buddha. In addition, many Buddhists (particularly Theravada Buddhists) do not worship the Buddha but instead "revere" and "express gratitude" for the Buddha's (and all buddhas') accomplishment and compassionate teaching (that is, discovering and teaching the Dharma so others might be released from suffering and achieve Nirvana).

Similar beliefs
Historically, Judaism has incorporated the wisdom of alien religions that do not contradict the Torah, while rejecting polytheism and the worship of graven images. Some experts speculate that Jesus and his early followers were converts to Buddhism who combined elements of their Jewish upbringing, such as monotheism, with Buddhist concepts like ahimsa, chastity, parables, or associating with outcasts.

Reincarnation

Many modern schools of Judaism have had a longstanding acknowledgement of a concept similar to reincarnation, known as gilgul. This belief is referred to not only within scripture, but also in many folk and traditional stories. Hasidic Jews and many others who follow the Kabbalah believe that a Jewish soul can be reborn on earth if, in its previous lives, it failed to fulfil all of the mitzvot required to enter paradise.

The practice of conversion to Judaism is sometimes understood within Orthodox Judaism in terms of reincarnation. According to this school of thought in Judaism, when non-Jews are drawn to Judaism, it is because they had been Jews in a former life. Such souls may "wander among nations" through multiple lives, until they find their way back to Judaism, including through finding themselves born in a gentile family with a "lost" Jewish ancestor.

Meditation
Many young Israelis are drawn to the appeal of Buddhist meditation as a means to alleviate the violence and conflict witnessed in their everyday lives, and explain the Jews' longstanding history of persecution. Orthodox Jews have embraced meditation since the 18th century as a means to commune with God, although modern Reform Jews have historically opposed it in favor of a more rational, intellectual form of worship. The children and grandchildren of Holocaust survivors find comfort in Buddhist explanations of the nature of suffering, and the path to end suffering. As Buddhism neither denies nor acknowledges the existence of Yahweh, observant Jews are able to embrace its wisdom while continuing to study the Torah.

Karma
Many Jews believe in a concept similar to the Buddhist interpretation of the karmic balance, known as middah k’neged middah (measure for measure). Evil deeds were believed to be repaid with misfortune, while good deeds brought rewards.

When bad things happened to good people, both Jews and Buddhists interpret it as a test of faith, an indication of suffering or imbalance in the wider community, or the result of the individual unintentionally causing harm through careless words. Although Buddhists believe that this was part of the natural order, Jews believe that God, as the creator of the universe, was responsible for setting these events in motion.

Five precepts
Both Judaism and Buddhism forbid murder, adultery, theft, and bearing false witness. In Buddhism, these comprise four of the five precepts, analogous to the Sixth, Seventh, Eighth and Ninth Commandments and also to the Third, Fourth, Fifth and Seventh Laws of Noah.

The fifth Buddhist precept discourages intoxication, which has elements of disapproval in the Tanakh. The drunkenness of Noah is perhaps the most famous example, but the Book of Proverbs also warns that alcohol abuse leads to misfortune, poverty and general sinfulness due to the removal of all inhibitions. Alcohol still plays a role in Jewish life, as wine is commonly used for religious rituals, such as the Kiddush and Brit milah, while some communities encourage drinking and even drunkenness during the holiday of Purim.

Bodhisattvas
In Buddhism, a bodhisattva is an enlightened person who has put off entry to paradise in order to help others gain enlightenment. Jews and Buddhists frequently regard the Prophets of the Old Testament as similar beings to the bodhisattvas because they too delay entry to the afterlife until they have completed their mission of saving the children of Israel during times of persecution.

The similarities between bodhisattvas and prophets is particularly appealing for Messianic Jews who respect Jesus as a prophet and teacher, but reject the Christian representatation of him as a deity. Inspired by the widespread belief that John the Baptist was the reincarnation of Elijah, some scholars of the Bible have speculated that Christ lived through several past lives, including as the pre-Israelite king Melchizedek and the Asian monk Amitabha.

See also
 Jews and Buddhism
 List of converts to Buddhism

References

Further reading
 
 
 
 
 
 
Musch, Sebastian. Jewish Encounters with Buddhism in German Culture. Between Moses and Buddha(1890-1940). Palgrave 2019. .

External links
 The “Oy Vey” School of Buddhism
 AFC News Source – Jews by birth who practice Buddhism
 Story of a Jewish Buddhist
 You don't look Buddhist
 A frank encounter between religious Jews and Tibetan Buddhists 
 Excerpt from Letters to a Buddhist Jew by Akiva Tatz

 
Buddhist
Religious syncretism